Reaching Quiet was an American alternative hip hop duo. It consisted of Yoni Wolf and Odd Nosdam. The duo released one album, In the Shadow of the Living Room, on Mush Records in 2002.

In 2001, Split EP! was released on Anticon. It contains Why?'s "You'll Know Where Your Plane Is..." and Odd Nosdam's "EAT." It features guest appearances from Mr. Dibbs.

Wolf and Odd Nosdam were also members of Clouddead along with Doseone.

Discography

Albums
 In the Shadow of the Living Room (2002)

Compilation appearances
 "113th Clean" on Ropeladder 12 (2000)

References

External links
 mushrecords.com/artist/40

Anticon
American hip hop groups